Joseph Eustace Shelley (8 September 1892 – 23 June 1966) was an Australian rules footballer who played with University in the Victorian Football League (VFL).

Family
The son of Edgar Shelley (1861-1949), and Blanche Shelley (1867-1960), née Rouse, Joseph Eustace Shelley was born at Caulfield, Victoria on 8 September 1892.

Education
Educated at Geelong Grammar School and at Melbourne Grammar School.

As a resident at Ormond College he attended the University of Melbourne.

He graduated Bachelor of Medicine and Bachelor of Surgery (MBBS) on 17 April 1915; and, during his time at the university he was awarded a "double blue" in cricket and football.

Military service
He enlisted in the First AIF on 7 July 1916, and left Sydney on 8 July 1916 (on the RMS Mongolia) to serve overseas in the Australian Army Medical Corps (AAMC).

He was discharged for the AIF in England (effective date 26 December 1919); and, rather than being repatriated to Australia, he independently went to Jerusalem, where his parents were living, and where he intended to practise medicine.

6 April 1925
While in Victoria, on holiday from his residence in Jerusalem, Shelley was staying at "Ferndale", the property of James Griffiths, of Griffiths Brothers' Tea, at Bayswater, Victoria. He was the sole survivor of an accident in which the wagonette, driven by Griffiths (on the way to Bayswater Station to meet Arthur Henry Harris, the manager of "Ferndale"), was hit by a train.

Three of the five occupants, James Griffiths, Elizabeth Morton, and Janet Emily Harris (Harris's daughter), were killed immediately, and the fourth, Emily Griffiths (James Griffiths' wife), died of her injuries four days later.

Death
He died at Melbourne, Victoria on 23 June 1966.

Footnotes

References
 Holmesby, Russell & Main, Jim (2007). The Encyclopedia of AFL Footballers. 7th ed. Melbourne: Bas Publishing.
 World War One Embarkation Roll: Captain Joseph Eustace Shelley, collection of the Australian War Memorial.
 World War One Service Record: Captain Joseph Eustace Shelley, National Archives of Australia.

External links

 

1892 births
1966 deaths
Australian rules footballers from Melbourne
University Football Club players
People educated at Geelong Grammar School
People educated at Melbourne Grammar School
Medical doctors from Melbourne
People from Caulfield, Victoria
Australian military doctors
Military personnel from Melbourne
Australian military personnel of World War I
Australian expatriates in Mandatory Palestine
20th-century Australian medical doctors
Survivors of railway accidents or incidents
Melbourne Medical School alumni
University of Melbourne alumni sportspeople